Beñat San José Gil (born 24 September 1979), is a Spanish retired footballer who played as a left winger, and is the manager of Bolívar.

He is the youngest manager in Gulf and Saudi history to have won a title, the 2013 Saudi Kings Cup at the age of 33 with Al-Ittihad.

Playing career
Born in San Sebastián, Gipuzkoa, Basque Country, San José represented Real Sociedad and Antiguoko as a youth. As a senior, he represented CD Hernani, Tolosa CF, CD Basconia, Berio FT, Orihuela CF, Saint-Jean de Luz Foot and Pasaia KE, aside from more than a year representing the Spain national beach soccer team.

Managerial career
San José started his coaching career with Ekintza Ikastola, and joined Real Sociedad's youth teams in 2008, from Antiguoko. In August 2012, he moved abroad, being named manager of the under-21 team of Al-Ittihad FC.

In February 2013, San José replaced compatriot Raúl Caneda at the helm of the first team, and finished the campaign in seventh; at the Kings Cup he led the club to the eight cup title of their history, and at the age of 33, he became the youngest manager to lift a trophy in Saudi Arabia. On 1 December, however, he was sacked.

In July 2014, San José was named Al-Ettifaq FC manager in the place of Ioan Andone, but was sacked the following 17 February. On 17 September 2015, he took over Deportes Antofagasta in Chile, replacing resigned José Cantillana.

On 22 May 2016, San José switched teams and countries again, after being appointed manager of Club Bolívar. On 20 December of the following year, he resigned, and was announced as Universidad Católica manager the following day.

On 10 December 2018, after lifting the year's Primera División trophy, San José left the UC, and joined Al-Nasr SC five days later. He was sacked the following 1 April, after a string of poor results.

On 24 June 2019, San José returned to Europe after being named manager of Belgian club KAS Eupen. On 27 April 2021, he left the club after opting to not renew his contract.

On 18 May 2021, San José was appointed as manager of Liga MX club Mazatlán. He was dismissed the following 2 March, with the club in the 14th position.

On 12 November 2022, San José agreed to return to Bolívar, replacing Antônio Carlos Zago.

Managerial statistics

Honours

Manager
Al-Ittihad
King Cup of Champions: 2013

Bolívar
Bolivian Primera División: 2017 Apertura, 2017 Clausura

Universidad Católica
 Chilean Primera División: 2018

References

External links

1979 births
Living people
Spanish footballers
Footballers from San Sebastián
Association football wingers
Antiguoko players
CD Hernani players
CD Basconia footballers
Real Sociedad C footballers
Orihuela CF players
Tercera División players
Spanish beach soccer players
Spanish football managers
Real Sociedad non-playing staff
Ittihad FC managers
Ettifaq FC managers
Deportes Antofagasta managers
Club Bolívar managers
Club Deportivo Universidad Católica managers
Al-Nasr SC (Dubai) managers
K.A.S. Eupen managers
Saudi Professional League managers
Chilean Primera División managers
Bolivian Primera División managers
Belgian Pro League managers
Spanish expatriate football managers
Spanish expatriate sportspeople in Saudi Arabia
Spanish expatriate sportspeople in Chile
Spanish expatriate sportspeople in Bolivia
Spanish expatriate sportspeople in Belgium
Expatriate football managers in Saudi Arabia
Expatriate football managers in Chile
Expatriate football managers in Bolivia
Expatriate football managers in Belgium
Expatriate football managers in Mexico